The languages of Italy include Italian, which serves as the country's national language, in its standard and regional forms, as well as numerous local and regional languages, most of which, like Italian, belong to the broader Romance group. The majority of languages often labeled as regional are distributed in a continuum across the regions' administrative boundaries, with speakers from one locale within a single region being typically aware of the features distinguishing their own variety from one of the other places nearby.

The official and most widely spoken language across the country is Italian, which started off as the medieval Tuscan of Florence. In parallel, many Italians also communicate in one of the local languages, most of which, like Tuscan, are indigenous evolutions of Vulgar Latin. Some local languages do not stem from Latin, however, but belong to other Indo-European branches, such as Cimbrian (Germanic), Arbëresh (Albanian), Slavomolisano (Slavic) and Griko (Greek). Other non-indigenous languages are spoken by a substantial percentage of the population due to immigration.

Of the indigenous languages, twelve are officially recognized as spoken by linguistic minorities: Albanian, Catalan, German, Greek, Slovene, Croatian, French, Franco-Provençal, Friulian, Ladin, Occitan and Sardinian; at the present moment, Sardinian is regarded as the largest of such groups, with approximately one million speakers, even though the Sardophone community is overall declining. However, full bilingualism (bilinguismo perfetto) is legally granted only to the three national minorities whose mother tongue is German, Slovene or French, and enacted in the regions of Trentino-Alto Adige, Friuli Venezia Giulia and the Aosta Valley, respectively.

Language or dialect 

Almost all of the Romance languages spoken in Italy are native to the area in which they are spoken. Apart from Standard Italian, these languages are often referred to as dialetti "dialects", both colloquially and in scholarly usage; however, the term may coexist with other labels like "minority languages" or "vernaculars" for some of them. The label "dialect" may be understood erroneously to imply that the native languages spoken in Italy are "dialects" of Standard Italian in the prevailing English-language sense of "varieties or variations of a language". This is not the case in Italy, as the country's long-standing linguistic diversity does not actually stem from Standard Italian. Most of Italy's variety of Romance languages predate Italian and evolved locally from Vulgar Latin, independently of what would become the standard national language, long before the fairly recent spread of Standard Italian throughout Italy. In fact, Standard Italian itself can be thought of as either a continuation of, or a dialect heavily based on, the Florentine dialect of Tuscan.

The indigenous Romance languages of Italy are therefore classified as separate languages that evolved from Latin just like Standard Italian, rather than "dialects" or variations of the latter. Conversely, with the spread of Standard Italian throughout Italy in the 20th century, local varieties of Standard Italian have also developed throughout the peninsula, influenced to varying extents by the underlying local languages, most noticeably at the phonological level; though regional boundaries seldom correspond to isoglosses distinguishing these varieties, these variations of Standard Italian are commonly referred to as Regional Italian (italiano regionale).

Twelve languages have been legally granted official recognition as of 1999, but their selection to the exclusion of others is a matter of some controversy. Daniele Bonamore argues that many regional languages were not recognized in light of their communities' historical participation in the construction of the Standard Italian language: Giacomo da Lentini's and Cielo d'Alcamo's Sicilian, Guido Guinizelli's Bolognese, Jacopone da Todi's Umbrian, Neapolitan, Carlo Goldoni's Venetian and Dante's Tuscan are considered to be historical founders of the Standard Italian linguistic majority; outside of such epicenters are, on the other hand, Friulian, Ladin, Sardinian, Franco-Provençal and Occitan, which are recognized as distinct languages. Michele Salazar found Bonamore's explanation "new and convincing".

Legal status of Italian
Italian was first declared to be Italy's official language during the Fascist period, more specifically through the R.D.l., adopted on 15 October 1925, with the name of Sull'Obbligo della lingua italiana in tutti gli uffici giudiziari del Regno, salvo le eccezioni stabilite nei trattati internazionali per la città di Fiume.

The original Italian constitution does not explicitly express that Italian is the official national language. Since the constitution was penned, there have been some laws and articles written on the procedures of criminal cases passed that explicitly state that Italian should be used:
Statute of the Trentino-South Tyrol, (constitutional law of the northern region of Italy around Trento) – "[...] " (Statuto Speciale per il Trentino-Alto Adige/Südtirol, Art. 99, "[...] [the language] Italian [...] is the official language of the State.")
Code for civil procedure – " (Codice di procedura civile, Art. 122, "In all procedures, the use of the Italian language is required.")
Code for criminal procedure – "" (Codice di procedura penale, Art. 109 [169-3; 63, 201 att.], "The acts of the criminal proceedings are carried out in the Italian language.")
Article 1 of law 482/1999 – "La lingua ufficiale della Repubblica è l'italiano." (Legge 482/1999, Art. 1 Comma 1, "The official language of the Republic is Italian.")

Historical linguistic minorities

Recognition by the Italian state

Art. 6 of the Italian Constitution was drafted by the Founding Fathers to show sympathy for the country's historical linguistic minorities, in a way for the newly founded Republic to let them become part of the national fabric and distance itself from the Italianization policies promoted earlier because of nationalism, especially during Fascism. Since 1934, Minister Francesco Ercole had excluded in fact from the school curriculum any language other than Italian, in accordance with the policy of linguistic nationalism.

For the Constitutional Court of the Italian Republic, Article 6 of the Constitution represents "the overcoming of the closed notion of the 19th-century national State and a reversal of great political and cultural significance, compared to the nationalistic attitude manifested by Fascism" as well as being "one of the fundamental principles of the current constitutional system".

However, more than a half century passed before the Art. 6 was followed by any of the above-mentioned "appropriate measures". Italy applied in fact the Article for the first time in 1999, by means of the national law N.482/99. According to the linguist Tullio De Mauro, the Italian delay of over 50 years in implementing Article 6 was caused by "decades of hostility to multilingualism" and "opaque ignorance".

Before said legal framework entered into force, only four linguistic minorities (the French-speaking community in the Aosta Valley; the German-speaking community and, to a limited extent, the Ladin one in the Province of Bolzano; the Slovene-speaking community in the Province of Trieste and, with less rights, the Province of Gorizia) enjoyed some kind of acknowledgment and protection, stemming from specific clauses within international treaties. The other eight linguistic minorities were to be recognized only in 1999, including the Slovene-speaking minority in the Province of Udine and the Germanic populations (Walser, Mocheni and Cimbri) residing in provinces different from Bolzano. Some now-recognized minority groups, namely in Friuli-Venezia Giulia and Sardinia, already provided themselves with regional laws of their own. It has been estimated that less than 400.000 people, out of the two million people belonging to the twelve historical minorities (with Sardinian being the numerically biggest one), enjoyed state-wide protection.

Around the 1960s, the Italian Parliament eventually resolved to apply the previously neglected article of the country's fundamental Charter. The Parliament thus appointed a "Committee of three Sages" to single out the groups that were to be recognized as linguistic minorities, and further elaborate the reason for their inclusion. The nominated people were Tullio de Mauro, Giovan Battista Pellegrini and Alessandro Pizzorusso, three notable figures who distinguished themselves with their life-long activity of research in the field of both linguistics and legal theory. Based on linguistic, historical as well as anthropological considerations, the experts eventually selected thirteen groups, corresponding to the currently recognized twelve with the further addition of the Sinti and Romani-speaking populations. The original list was approved, with the only exception of the nomadic peoples, who lacked the territoriality requisite and therefore needed a separate law. However, the draft was presented to the law-making bodies when the legislature was about to run its course, and had to be passed another time. The bill was met with resistance by all the subsequent legislatures, being reluctant to challenge the widely-held myth of "Italian linguistic homogeneity", and only in 1999 did it eventually pass, becoming a law. In the end, the historical linguistic minorities have been recognized by the Law no. 482/1999 (Legge 15 Dicembre 1999, n. 482, Art. 2, comma 1).

Some interpretations of said law seem to divide the twelve minority languages into two groups, with the first including the non-Latin speaking populations (with the exception of the Catalan-speaking one) and the second including only the Romance-speaking populations. Some other interpretations state that a further distinction is implied, considering only some groups to be "national minorities". Regardless of the ambiguous phrasing, all the twelve groups are technically supposed to be allowed the same measures of protection; furthermore, the Framework Convention for the Protection of National Minorities, signed and ratified by Italy in 1997, applies to all the twelve groups mentioned by the 1999 national law, therefore including the Friulians, the Sardinians, the Occitans, the Ladins etc., with the addition of the Romani.

In actual practice, not each of the twelve historical linguistic minorities is given the same consideration. All of them still bear strong social pressure to assimilate to Italian, and some of them do not even have a widely acknowledged standard to be used for official purposes. In fact, the discrimination lay in the urgent need to award the highest degree of protection only to the French-speaking minority in the Aosta Valley and the German one in South Tyrol, owing to international treaties. For example, the institutional websites are only in Italian with a few exceptions, like a French version of the Italian Chamber of Deputies. A bill proposed by former prime minister Mario Monti's cabinet formally introduced a differential treatment between the twelve historical linguistic minorities, distinguishing between those with a "foreign mother tongue" (the groups protected by agreements with Austria, France and Slovenia) and those with a "peculiar dialect" (all the others). The bill was later implemented, but deemed unconstitutional by the Constitutional Court.

Recognition at the European level
Italy is a signatory of the European Charter for Regional or Minority Languages, but has not ratified the treaty, and therefore its provisions protecting regional languages do not apply in the country.

The Charter does not, however, establish at what point differences in expression result in a separate language, deeming it an "often controversial issue", and citing the necessity to take into account, other than purely linguistic criteria, also "psychological, sociological and political considerations".

Regional recognition of the local languages
Aosta Valley: 
French is co-official (enjoying the same dignity and standing of Italian) in the whole region (Le Statut spécial de la Vallée d'Aoste, Title VIe, Article 38);
Franco-Provençal is unofficial, but protected and promoted according to federal and regional laws. 
German is unofficial but recognised in the Lys Valley (Lystal) (Le Statut spécial de la Vallée d'Aoste, Title VIe, Art. 40 - bis).

Apulia: 
Griko, Arbëresh and Franco-Provençal are recognized and safeguarded (Legge regionale 5/2012).
Calabria:
Calabrian Greek, Arbëresh and Occitan are officially recognized and safeguarded.
Friuli-Venezia Giulia:
Friulian and Slovene are "promoted", but not recognised, by the region (Legge regionale 18 dicembre 2007, n. 29, Art. 1, comma 1); (Legge regionale 16 novembre 2007, n. 26, Art. 16).

Lombardy:
Lombard is unofficial but recognised as the regional language (Legge regionale 25/2016).
Piedmont:
Piedmontese is unofficial but recognised as the regional language (Consiglio Regionale del Piemonte, Ordine del Giorno n. 1118, Presentato il 30 November 1999); 
the region "promotes", without recognising, the Occitan, Franco-Provençal, French and Walser languages (Legge regionale 7 aprile 2009, n. 11, Art. 1).
Sardinia: 
The region considers the cultural identity of the Sardinian people as a primary asset (l.r. N.26/97, l.r. N.22/18), in accordance with the values of equality and linguistic pluralism enshrined in the Italian Constitution and the European treaties, with particular reference to the European Charter for Regional or Minority Languages and the Framework Convention for the Protection of National Minorities (l.r. N.26/97). All the languages indigenous to the island (Sardinian, Catalan, Tabarchino, Sassarese and Gallurese) are recognised and promoted as "enjoying the same dignity and standing of Italian" (l.r. N.26/97) in their respective linguistic areas.
Sicily: 
Sicilian is unofficial but recognised as the regional language (Legge regionale 9/2011).
South Tyrol:
German is co-official (enjoying the same dignity and standing of Italian) in the province of South Tyrol (Statuto speciale per il Trentino-Alto Adige, Titolo XI, Articolo 99); Ladin is the third co-official language of South Tirol 
Trentino: 
Ladin, Cimbrian, and Mòcheno are unofficial but recognised in (Statuto speciale per il Trentino-Alto Adige, Titolo XI, Articolo 102).
Veneto:
Venetan is unofficial but recognised and promoted (Legge regionale 13 aprile 2007, n. 8, Art. 2, comma 2).

Conservation status

According to the UNESCO's Atlas of the World's Languages in Danger, there are 31 endangered languages in Italy. The degree of endangerment is classified in different categories ranging from 'safe' (safe languages are not included in the atlas) to 'extinct' (when there are no speakers left).

The source for the languages' distribution is the Atlas of the World's Languages in Danger unless otherwise stated, and refers to Italy exclusively.

Vulnerable
Alemannic: spoken in the Lys Valley of the Aosta Valley and in Northern Piedmont
Bavarian: South Tyrol
Ladin: several valleys, comunes and villages in the Dolomites, including the Val Badia and the Gardena Valley in South Tyrol, the Fascia Valley in Trentino, and Livinallongo in the Province of Belluno
Sicilian: Sicily, southern and central Calabria and southern Apulia
Neapolitan: Campania, Basilicata, Abruzzo, Molise, northern Calabria, northern and central Apulia, southern Lazio and Marche as well as eastern fringes of Umbria
Romanesco: Metropolitan City of Rome in Lazio and in some communes of southern Tuscany
Venetian: Veneto, parts of Friuli-Venezia Giulia

Definitely endangered
Algherese Catalan: the town of Alghero in northwestern Sardinia; an outlying dialect of Catalan language not listed separately by the SIL International.
Occitan Alpine Provençal: the upper valleys of Piedmont (Val Mairo, Val Varacho, Val d'Esturo, Entraigas, Limoun, Vinai, Pinerolo, Sestrieres)
Arbëresh: (i) Adriatic zone: Montecilfone, Campomarino, Portocannone and Ururi in Molise as well as Chieuti and Casalvecchio di Puglia in Apulia; (ii) San Marzano in Apulia; (iii) Greci in Campania; (iv) northern Basilicata: Barile, Ginestra and Maschito; (v) North Calabrian zone: ca. 30 settlements in northern Calabria (Plataci, Civita, Frascineto, San Demetrio Corone, Lungro, Acquaformosa etc.) as well as San Costantino Albanese and San Paolo Lucano in southern Basilicata; (vi) settlements in southern Calabria, e.g. San Nicola dell'Alto and Vena di Maida; (vii) Sicilian zone: Piana degli Albanesi and two nearby villages near Palermo; (viii) formerly also Villabadessa in Abruzzo; an outlying dialect of Albanian
Cimbrian: vigorously spoken in Luserna in Trentino; disappearing in Giazza (part of the commune Selva di Progno) in the Province of Verona and in Roana in the Province of Vicenza; recently extinct in several other locations in the region; an outlying dialect of Bavarian
Corsican: spoken on Maddalena Island off the northeast coast of Sardinia
Emilian: North to Northwestern Emilia-Romagna, parts of the provinces of Pavia, Voghera, and Mantua in southern Lombardy, the Lunigiana district in northwestern Tuscany and in a zone called Traspadana Ferrarese in the Province of Rovigo in Veneto
Romagnol: Southeastern Emilia-Romagna, the Alta Valle del Tevere district in northern part of the Province of Perugia and eastern part of the Province of Arezzo, the Province of Pesaro-Urbino in the Marche (disputed)
Faetar: Faeto and Celle San Vito in the Province of Foggia in Apulia; a variety of Franco-Provençal not listed separately by the SIL
Franco-Provençal: spoken in the Aosta Valley (Valdôtain dialect) and the Alpine valleys to the north and east of the Susa Valley in Piedmont
Friulan: Friuli-Venezia Giulia except the Province of Trieste and western and eastern border regions, and Portogruaro area in the Province of Venice in Veneto
Gallo-Italic of Sicily: Nicosia, Sperlinga, Piazza Armerina, Valguarnera Caropepe and Aidone in the province of Enna, and San Fratello, Acquedolci, San Piero Patti, Montalbano Elicona, Novara di Sicilia and Fondachelli-Fantina in the province of Messina; an outlying dialect of Lombard not listed separately by the SIL; other dialects were formerly also spoken in southern Italy outside Sicily, especially in Basilicata
Gallurese: northeastern Sardinia; an outlying dialect of Corsican
Ligurian: Liguria and adjacent areas of Piedmont, Emilia and Tuscany; settlements in the towns of Carloforte on the San Pietro Island and Calasetta on the Sant'Antioco Island off the southwest coast of Sardinia
Lombard: Lombardy (except the southernmost border areas) and the Province of Novara in Piedmont
Mòcheno: Palù, Fierozzo and Frassilongo in the Fersina Valley in Trentino; an outlying dialect of Bavarian
Piedmontese: Piedmont except the Province of Novara, the western Alpine valleys and southern border areas, as well as minor adjacent areas
Resian: Resia in the northeastern part of the Province of Udine; an outlying dialect of Slovene not listed separately by the SIL
Romani: spoken by the Roma community in Italy
Sardinian, consisting of both the Campidanese (southern Sardinia) and Logudorese (central Sardinia) dialects
Sassarese: northwestern Sardinia; a transitional language between Corsican and Sardinian
Yiddish: spoken by parts of the Jewish community in Italy

Severely endangered
Walser German: the village of Issime in the upper Lys Valley/Lystal in the Aosta Valley; an outlying dialect of Alemannic not listed separately by the SIL. It is considered by Glottolog to be a separate language.
Molise Croatian: the villages of Montemitro, San Felice del Molise, and Acquaviva Collecroce in the Province of Campobasso in southern Molise; a mixed Chakavian–Shtokavian dialect of Serbo-Croatian not listed separately by the SIL. It is considered by Glottolog to be a separate language.
Griko: the Salento peninsula in the Province of Lecce in southern Apulia; an outlying dialect of Greek not listed separately by the SIL. It is considered by Glottolog to be a separate language known as Apulia-Calabrian Greek.
Gardiol Occitan: Guardia Piemontese in Calabria; an outlying dialect of Occitan Alpine Provençal. It is considered by Glottolog to be a separate language.
Griko (Calabria): a few villages near Reggio di Calabria in southern Calabria; an outlying dialect of Greek not listed separately by the SIL. It is considered by Glottolog to be a separate language known as Apulia-Calabrian Greek.

Classification
All living languages indigenous to Italy are part of the Indo-European language family.

They can be divided into Romance languages and non-Romance languages. The classification of the Romance languages of Italy is controversial, and listed here are two of the generally accepted classification systems.

Romance languages
The following five linguistic areas can be identified:

 Northern (dialetti settentrionali):
 Gallo-Italic (Emilian, Piedmontese, Lombard, and Ligurian).
 Venetian.
 Friulian.
 Tuscan.
 Mid-Southern (dialetti centro-meridionali):
 Middle (dialetti mediani; Central Marchigiano, Umbrian, Laziale).
 Upper Southern (dialetti alto-meridionali; Marchigiano-Abruzzese, Molisano, Apulian, Southern Laziale and Campanian including Neapolitan, Northern Lucano-Calabrese).
 Extreme Southern (dialetti meridionali estremi; Salentino, Calabrian, Sicilian).
 Sardinian.

The following classification is proposed by :

 Northern varieties:
 Northern Italo-Romance:
 'Gallo-Italian' (Piedmont, Lombardy, Liguria and Emilia-Romagna).
 Venetan.
 Ladin.
 Friulian.
 Central and Southern:
 Tuscan (with Corsican).
 'Middle Italian' (Marche, Umbria, Lazio).
 Upper Southern (Abruzzo, northern Puglia, Molise, Campania, Basilicata).
 Extreme Southern (Salento, southern Calabria and Sicily).
 Sardinian.

Non-Romance languages

Albanian, Slavic, Greek and Romani languages

High German languages

Geographic distribution

Northern Italy
The Northern Italian languages are conventionally defined as those Romance languages spoken north of the La Spezia–Rimini Line, which runs through the northern Apennine Mountains just to the north of Tuscany; however, the dialects of Occitan and Franco-Provençal spoken in the extreme northwest of Italy (e.g. the Valdôtain in the Aosta Valley) are generally excluded. The classification of these languages is difficult and not agreed-upon, due both to the variations among the languages and to the fact that they share isoglosses of various sorts with both the Italo-Romance languages to the south and the Gallo-Romance languages to the northwest.

One common classification divides these languages into four groups:
The Italian Rhaeto-Romance languages, including Ladin and Friulian.
The poorly researched Istriot language.
The Venetian language (sometimes grouped with the majority Gallo-Italian languages).
The Gallo-Italian languages, including all the rest (although with some doubt regarding the position of Ligurian).

Any such classification runs into the basic problem that there is a dialect continuum throughout northern Italy, with a continuous transition of spoken dialects between e.g. Venetian and Ladin, or Venetian and Emilio-Romagnolo (usually considered Gallo-Italian).

All of these languages are considered innovative relative to the Romance languages as a whole, with some of the Gallo-Italian languages having phonological changes nearly as extreme as standard French (usually considered the most phonologically innovative of the Romance languages). This distinguishes them significantly from standard Italian, which is extremely conservative in its phonology (and notably conservative in its morphology).

Southern Italy and islands
Approximate distribution of the regional languages of Sardinia and Southern Italy according to the UNESCO's Atlas of the World's Languages in Danger:

One common classification divides these languages into two groups:
The Italo-Dalmatian languages, including Neapolitan and Sicilian, as well as the Sardinian-influenced Sassarese and Gallurese which are sometimes grouped with Sardinian but are actually of southern Corsican origin.
The Sardinian language, usually listed as a group of its own with two main Logudorese and Campidanese orthographic forms.

All of these languages are considered conservative relative to the Romance languages as a whole, with Sardinian being the most conservative of them all.

Mother tongues of foreign citizens in Italy

Standardised written forms
Although "[al]most all Italian dialects were being written in the Middle Ages, for administrative, religious, and often artistic purposes," use of local language gave way to stylized Tuscan, eventually labeled Italian. Local languages are still occasionally written, but only the following regional languages of Italy have a standardised written form. This may be widely accepted or used alongside more traditional written forms:
 Piedmontese: traditional, definitely codified between the 1920s and the 1960s by Pinin Pacòt and Camillo Brero
 Ligurian: "Grafîa ofiçiâ" created by the Académia Ligùstica do Brénno;
 Sardinian: "Limba Sarda Comuna" was experimentally adopted in 2006;
 Friulian: "Grafie uficiâl" created by the Osservatori Regjonâl de Lenghe e de Culture Furlanis;
 Ladin: "Grafia Ladina" created by the Istituto Ladin de la Dolomites;
 Venetian: "Grafia Veneta Unitaria", the official manual published in 1995 by the Regione Veneto local government, although written in Italian. It has been recently updated on 14 December 2017, under the name of "Grafia Veneta Ufficiale".

Gallery

See also

 Bilingual sign
 Language geography
 Regional Italian

Notes

References

External links
 NavigAIS  Online version of the Sprach- und Sachatlas Italiens und der Südschweiz (AIS) (Linguistic and Ethnographic Atlas of Italy and Southern Switzerland)
 An interactive map of languages and dialects in Italy
 Ethnologue - Languages of Italy
 Rivista Etnie, linguistica